El malquerido is a 2015 biographical film directed by Venezuelan filmmaker Diego Rísquez, starring Jesús Miranda (Chyno Miranda) and  Greisy Mena. The film is based on the life of the Venezuelan bolero singer Felipe Pirela.

Plot 
The film portrays the life of Venezuelan singer Felipe Pirela, "El bolerista de América", from the moment inspiration and the path of music opened in a radio station in Maracaibo, to the conquest of international markets and places.

Cast 

 Jesús Chyno Miranda as Felipe Pirela
 Greisy Mena as Mariela Montiel
 Sheila Monterola as Mamá Lucía
 Héctor Manrique as Billo Frómeta
 Mariaca Semprún as Aminta
 Carlos Cruz as Portabales
 Sócrates Serrano as Daniel Sánchez
 Samantha Castillo as La Lupe
 Dylan Pérez Reyes as Felipe Pirela joven
 Natalia Roman as Paquita
  as Dante
 Iván Tamayo as José Paiva

Production 
Filming began in Caracas at the beginning of March 2015, lasting a month
 In April 2015, the crew filmed key scenes in Maracaibo, from locations such as the Baralt Plaza, the Chiquinquirá Basilica, the Fonoplatea de los Éxitos, and other locations. The production was made between Producciones Guakamaya, the Centro Nacional de Cinematografía (CNAC), Pedro Mezquita, Xenon Films, Ron Santa Teresa and the Zulia state government, with the support of the audiovisual department-cinema club of the University of Zulia culture department.

Despite being biographical, the director warned that the film had elements of fiction, since he did not intend to "make a documentary", and that "The cinema I make is not an obvious cinema, it is a suggestive cinema. There is a main story, but there are always subplots where I let the viewer draw their own conclusions".

The singer "Chino" Miranda, besides acting in the film, also interprets the 16 songs in the movie. The film was premiered at the Sala de Artes Escénicas del Centro de Arte de Maracaibo Lía Bermúdez (CAMLB).

Reception 
The film was watched by 22,000 people three days after its premiere. according to the Venezuelan Association of the Film Industry (Asoinci), the film was the highest grossing national production in 2015 and was watched by more than 210,829 people from its premiere until 11 January 2016.

It was awarded Best Film at the Mérida Film Festival in 2016.

Some Venezuelan critics and journalists criticized biographical inaccuracies and part of the cast.

References

External links 
  
 El malquerido at FilmAffinity

Films shot in Venezuela
Venezuelan musical films
Venezuelan biographical films
Venezuelan drama films
2015 films
2010s Spanish-language films